Ágnes Babos (12 May 1944 – 13 May 2020) was a Hungarian handball player and World champion.

She was born in Kecskemét and died on 13 May 2020.

Achievements
Nemzeti Bajnokság I:
Winner: 1972, 1973, 1974, 1975
Magyar Kupa:
Winner: 1965, 1969, 1971, 1974, 1976
World Championship:
Winner: 1965
Bronze Medalist: 1971

Awards
 Hungarian Handballer of the Year: 1970, 1972

References

1944 births
2020 deaths
People from Kecskemét
Hungarian female handball players
Sportspeople from Bács-Kiskun County